Dana, proizvodnja in prodaja pijač (English: Dana, the manufacture and sale of drinks) is a major Slovenian manufacturer of alcoholic and non-alcoholic beverages. It is located in the village of Mirna in southeastern Slovenia.

The company was established as a work organization in 1952. The brand Dana was registered in 1955. At first, the company produced only alcoholic beverages. After 1970, the program was expanded with the non-alcohol beverages. Since 2005, Dana has made the majority of profit with its high-quality natural mineral water Dana. In July 2012, the company was transformed from a joint-stock company to a limited liability company. It changed its name from Dana, tovarna rastlinskih specialitet in destilacija, d.d. (English: Dana, the plant specialties factory and distillation)  to Dana, proizvodnja in prodaja pijač, d.o.o. (English: Dana, the manufacture and sale of drinks).

In 2000, Dana was ISO 9001 certified. In 2009, it obtained the International Food Standard (IFS) certificate.

References

External links
 Dana Homepage
 

Drink companies of Slovenia
Bottled water brands
Slovenian brands
Distilleries
Alcoholic drink companies
Food and drink companies established in 1952
Mirna, Mirna
1952 establishments in Slovenia